Isa Beyglu (also Romanized as ‘Īsá Beyglū; also known as ‘Aīsbaklu and Īsā Beglū) is a village in Qeshlaqat-e Afshar Rural District, Afshar District, Khodabandeh County, Zanjan Province, Iran. At the 2006 census, its population was 23, in 4 families.

References 

Populated places in Khodabandeh County